Elijah Wood is an American actor and film producer. The following is a filmography of his work.

He made his film debut with a minor part in Back to the Future Part II (1989), then landed a succession of larger roles that made him a critically acclaimed child actor by age 9, being nominated for several Young Artist Awards. As a child actor he starred in the films Radio Flyer (1992), The Good Son (1993), North (1994) and Flipper (1996), and began to transfer to teenage roles in the films The Ice Storm (1997), Deep Impact and The Faculty (both 1998). He is best known for his high-profile leading role as Frodo Baggins in Peter Jackson's The Lord of the Rings trilogy (2001–2003) and its prequel The Hobbit: An Unexpected Journey (2012). Since then, he has resisted typecasting by choosing varied roles in critically acclaimed films such as Eternal Sunshine of the Spotless Mind (2004), Sin City, Everything Is Illuminated (2005) and Bobby (2006).

Wood also voiced Mumble in the Happy Feet film series (2006-2011), and the titular protagonist in the Tim Burton-produced action/science fiction film 9 (2009). In 2005, he started his own record label, Simian Records. He did the voice acting for Spyro in the Legend of Spyro trilogy. In 2012, he began voicing Beck in the animated series Tron: Uprising, and Sigma in the tenth season of the Rooster Teeth series Red vs. Blue. From 2011 to 2014, Wood played the role of Ryan Newman in FX's dark comedy Wilfred.

Film

Television

Video games

Discography

Music videos
 Paula Abdul: "Forever Your Girl" (1989)
 The Cranberries: "Ridiculous Thoughts" (1995)
 The Apples in Stereo: "Energy" (as director) (2006)
 Greg Laswell: "How the Day Sounds" (2008)
 The Lonely Island: "Threw It On the Ground" (2009)
 Danko Jones: "Full of Regret" (2010)
 The Apples in Stereo: "Dance Floor" (2010)
 Danko Jones: "I Think Bad Thoughts" (2011)
 Beastie Boys: "Make Some Noise" (2011)
 Flying Lotus: "Tiny Tortures" (2012)

Audiobooks
 1999 The Most Beautiful Gift: A Christmas Story
 2009 Witch & Wizard
 2010 Witch & Wizard: The Gift
 2010 Adventures of Huckleberry Finn. Nominated— Audie Award for Best Audiobook Performance
 2011 Witch & Wizard: The Fire

References

General

External links
 
 

Wood, Elijah
Wood, Elijah